Akaki (Georgian: აკაკი) is a Georgian masculine given name. Notable people with the name include:
Akaki Asatiani (born 1953), Georgian politician 
Akaki Bakradze (1928–1999), Georgian writer, literary critic, art historian, and public figure 
Akaki Beliashvili (1903/1904–1961), Georgian writer 
Akaki Chachua (born 1969), Georgian wrestler 
Akaki Chanturia (1881–1949), Georgian scientist, archeologist and ethnographer
Akaki Chkhenkeli (1874–1959), Georgian Marxist politician
Akaki Devadze (born 1971), Georgian footballer 
Akaki Eliava (1956–2000), Georgian military officer
Akaki Gogia (born 1992), Georgian-born German footballer
Akaki Kakauridze (1972–2001), Georgian-born Turkish boxer
Akaki Khorava (1895–1972), Georgian actor, theater director, and pedagogue
Akaki Khoshtaria (1873–1932), Georgian entrepreneur, socialite and philanthropist
Akaki Khubutia (born 1986), Georgian footballer
Akaki Meipariani (1918–1995), Georgian fencer  
Akaki Mgeladze (1910–1980), Georgian-Soviet politician  was a Soviet politician
Akaki Mikuchadze (born 1980), Georgian footballer
Akaki Minashvili (born 1980), Georgian politician
Akaki Shanidze (1887–1987), Georgian linguist, philologist and academician
Akaki Surguladze (1913–1991), Georgian historian
Akaki Tabutsadze (born 1997), Georgian rugby union player
Akaki Tsereteli (1840–1915), Georgian poet
Akaki Tskarozia (born 1988), Georgian footballer

Georgian masculine given names